Dominick Cafferky (died 15 March 1971) was an Irish Clann na Talmhan politician. A farmer from Kilkelly, County Mayo, he was first elected to Dáil Éireann as a Clann na Talmhan Teachta Dála (TD) for the Mayo South constituency at the 1943 general election. He was re-elected at the 1944 general election but lost his seat at the 1948 general election. He re-gained his seat at the 1951 general election but again lost his seat at the 1954 general election. He was an unsuccessful candidate at the 1957 and 1961 general elections.

In the early 1940s, Cafferky was imprisoned with Bernard Commons for one month in Sligo Prison for his part in land agitation in Mayo, after which he won a Dáil seat.

See also
List of members of the Oireachtas imprisoned since 1923

References

Year of birth missing
1971 deaths
Clann na Talmhan TDs
Members of the 11th Dáil
Members of the 12th Dáil
Members of the 14th Dáil
Politicians from County Mayo
21st-century Irish farmers